Milano Porta Venezia is an underground railway station in Milan, Italy. It is on the Milan Passante railway and is located near Corso Buenos Aires.

Services 
Milano Porta Venezia is served by lines S1, S2, S5, S6, S12, and S13 of the Milan suburban railway network, operated by the regional railway company Trenord.

See also 
Railway stations in Milan
Milan suburban railway network
Milan Passante railway

References

External links 

Porta Venezia
Railway stations opened in 1997
Milan S Lines stations
Railway stations located underground in Italy
1997 establishments in Italy
Railway stations in Italy opened in the 20th century